Keramat Daneshian  (1944, Shiraz – 18 February 1974, Tehran) (کرامت‌الله دانشیان) was an Iranian director, poet and communist activist. In 1974, he was convicted, along with Khosrow Golsorkhi, of plotting to kidnap the Shah of Iran's son, allegedly to pressure SAVAK into releasing certain imprisoned members of his group.
They were both later executed.

Further reading
 Trees must sing songs again

References

20th-century Iranian poets
Iranian activists
Iranian communists
People from Shiraz
Executed Iranian people
People executed by Pahlavi Iran
1944 births
1974 deaths
Burials at Behesht-e Zahra
Iranian revolutionaries
20th-century poets
Qashqai people
Executed communists